The Tibetan fox (Vulpes ferrilata), also known as the Tibetan sand fox, is a species of true fox endemic to the high Tibetan Plateau, Ladakh plateau, Nepal, China, Sikkim, and Bhutan, up to elevations of about . It is listed as Least Concern in the IUCN Red List, on account of its widespread range in the Tibetan Plateau's steppes and semi-deserts.

Characteristics 
The Tibetan fox is small and compact, with a soft, dense coat, conspicuously narrow muzzle, and bushy tail. Its  muzzle, crown, neck, back and lower legs are tan to rufous coloured, while its cheeks, flanks, upper legs and rumps are grey. Its tail has white tips. The short ears are tan to greyish tan on the back, while the insides and undersides are white. Weights of adults are usually .

Among the true foxes, its skull is the most specialised in the direction of carnivory; it is longer in the condylobasal length, and in mandible and cheek tooth length, than those of hill foxes. Its cranial region is shorter than that of hill foxes, and the zygomatic arches narrower. Its  jaws are also much narrower, and the forehead concave. Its canine teeth are also much longer than those of hill foxes.

Distribution and habitat 
The Tibetan fox is restricted to the Tibetan Plateau in western China and the Ladakh plateau in northern India. It occurs north of the Himalayas in the northernmost border regions of Nepal and India, across Tibet, and in parts of the Chinese provinces of Qinghai, Gansu, Xinjiang, Yunnan and Sichuan. It primarily inhabits semi-arid to arid grasslands, well away from humans or from heavy vegetation cover.

Behaviour and ecology 
The Tibetan fox primarily preys on plateau pikas, followed by rodents, marmots, woolly hares, rabbits, small ground birds and lizards. It also scavenges on the carcasses of Tibetan antelopes, musk deer, blue sheep and livestock. Tibetan foxes are mostly solitary, daytime hunters as their main prey, pikas, are diurnal. Tibetan foxes may form commensal relationships with brown bears during hunts for pikas. The bears dig out the pikas, and the foxes grab them when they escape the bears.

Mated pairs remain together and may also hunt together. After a gestation period of about 50 to 60 days, two to four young are born in a den, and stay with the parents until they are eight to ten months old. Their burrows are made at the base of boulders, at old beach lines and low slopes. Dens may have four entrances, with entrances being 25–35 cm in diameter.

Diseases and parasites 
Tibetan foxes in the Sêrxü County of China's Sichuan province are heavily infected with Echinococcus, while foxes in western Sichuan are definitive hosts of alveolar hydatid disease.

In culture 
A photograph of a Himalayan marmot under attack by a Tibetan fox won the first prize in the 2019 Wildlife Photographer of the Year award.

References

External links 

Tibetan fox
Mammals of Tibet
Mammals of Nepal
Mammals of Bhutan
Fauna of Jammu and Kashmir
Fauna of Sikkim
Tibetan fox